Justice Main may refer to:

James Allen Main (born 1945), associate justice of the Supreme Court of Alabama
John F. Main, associate justice of the Washington Supreme Court

See also
 Main Justice, the centralized headquarters of the United States Department of Justice